was a Japanese football player and manager. He played for Japan national team.

Club career
Hiraki was born in Sakai on October 7, 1931. After graduating from Kwansei Gakuin University, he joined Yuasa Batteries in 1957. In 1958, he moved to Furukawa Electric. Furukawa Electric won 1960, 1961 and 1964 Emperor's Cup. In 1965, Furukawa Electric joined new league Japan Soccer League. He played 6 games in the league. He retired in 1966.

National team career
In March 1954, when Hiraki was a Kwansei Gakuin University student, he was selected Japan national team for 1954 World Cup qualification. At this qualification, on March 14, he debuted against South Korea. In 1956, he was selected Japan for 1956 Summer Olympics in Melbourne. He also played at 1954, 1958 and 1962 Asian Games. In 1964, he was selected Japan as captain for 1964 Summer Olympics in Tokyo. However, he could not play for injury. After 1964 Summer Olympics, he retired from national team. He played 30 games and scored 1 goal for Japan until 1962.

Coaching career
In 1962, when Hiraki played for Furukawa Electric, he became a playing manager as Ken Naganuma successor for the club and managed until 1965. He also served a coach for Japan national team and a manager for Japan U-20 national team. In 1968, he participated as a coach in 1968 Summer Olympics in Mexico City and Japan team won Bronze Medal. In 2018, this team was selected Japan Football Hall of Fame. In 1992, he signed with Nagoya Grampus Eight joined new league J.League and he managed until 1993.

In 2005, Hiraki was selected Japan Football Hall of Fame. On January 2, 2009, he died of pneumonia in Toyota at the age of 77.

Club statistics

National team statistics

Managerial statistics

References

External links
 
 Japan National Football Team Database

Japan Football Hall of Fame at Japan Football Association
Japan Football Hall of Fame (Japan team at 1968 Olympics) at Japan Football Association
 
 

1931 births
2009 deaths
Kwansei Gakuin University alumni
Association football people from Osaka Prefecture
Japanese footballers
Japan international footballers
Japan Soccer League players
JEF United Chiba players
Olympic footballers of Japan
People from Sakai, Osaka
Footballers at the 1956 Summer Olympics
Footballers at the 1964 Summer Olympics
Footballers at the 1954 Asian Games
Footballers at the 1958 Asian Games
Footballers at the 1962 Asian Games
Japanese football managers
J1 League managers
Nagoya Grampus managers
Deaths from pneumonia in Japan
Association football defenders
Asian Games competitors for Japan